Das deutsche Schrifttum über den Völkerbund, 1917–1925 (The German Literature on the League of Nations), is a book edited by Prussian librarians Fritz Junkke and Hans Sveistrup in 1927; the work is a bibliographic collection of German-language publications on the activities of the League of Nations, that contains, both, monographs and journal articles - as well as some newspaper notes.

References 

 Max Gunzenhäuser. Die Pariser Friedenskonferenz 1919 und die Friedensverträge 1919–1920. Literaturbericht und Bibliographie : [de]. — Frankfurt/M. : Bernard & Graefe, 1970. — vii, 287 S. — (Schriften der Bibliothek für Zeitgeschichte, Stuttgart: Heft 9).
 Christoph M. Kimmich. German Foreign Policy, 1918-1945: A Guide to Current Research and Resources. — Scarecrow Press, 2013. — P. 132. — 343 p. — .
 Wehberg. Review of Das deutsche Schrifttum über den Völkerbund. 1917—1925 (нем.) // Die Friedens-Warte. — 1927. — Oktober (Bd. 27, H. 10). — S. 314–314.
 W. G. Grewe. Review of Der Volkerbund. Organisation und Tatigkeit (Handbuch des Volkerrechts, Erste Abteilung B des vierten Bandes), Otto Goppert [de] // Zeitschrift für Politik. — 1938. — Nov./Dez. (Bd. 28, H. 11/12). — S. 722–723.
 C. Rühland. Völkerrechtsliteratur [de] // Zeitschrift für die gesamte Staatswissenschaft / Journal of Institutional and Theoretical Economics. — 1928. — Bd. 85, H. 3. — S. 569–578.
 Das deutsche Schrifttum über den Völkerbund, 1917–1925 // Journal of the Royal Institute of International Affairs. — 1930. — July. — P. 550. — DOI:10.1093/ia/9.4.550b.
 William L. Langer. Some Recent Books on International Relations // Foreign Affairs. — 1928. — January (vol. 6, iss. 2). — P. 338–348. — DOI:10.2307/20028612.
 über den Völkerbund 1917—1925 [de] // Deutsches Schrifttum (1927).
 Zeitschrift für Politik, Jg. 18 (1929), S. 136.
 Europäische Gespräche: Hamburger Monatshefte für auswärtige Politik, Jg. 5, Heft 2 (1927), S. 78.
 Geschichte in Wissenschaft und Unterricht, Jg. 22 (1971), S. 198.

1927 non-fiction books
German books
History books about World War I
Published bibliographies